This article has details on FC Energie Cottbus statistics.

Recent seasons (from 1991 onwards)

Honours
 German Cup:
 Runners-up 1997
 Regionalliga Nordost: 2
 Winners 1997 (III), 2018 (IV)
 German Under 17 championship:
 runners-up 2004

External links 
 Official website (German)

German football club statistics